Eucalyptus interstans is a species of small to medium-sized tree endemic to New South Wales and Queensland. It has smooth white or greyish bark, lance-shaped or curved adult leaves, flower buds in groups of between seven and eleven, white flowers and cup-shaped to hemispherical fruit.

Description
It has smooth, mottled white and greyish bark that is shed in large plates or flakes. Flowering occurs in June and the flowers are white. The fruit is a woody, cup-shaped or hemispherical capsule with the valves extending well beyond the rim of the fruit.

Taxonomy and naming
Eucalyptus interstans was first formally described in 1990 by Lawrie Johnson and Ken Hill from a specimen collected in 1911 at Wilsons Downfall near Stanthorpe by Richard Cambage. The description was published in the journal Telopea. The specific epithet (interstans) is derived from Latin words meaning 'standing between' referring to the intermediate position of this species between E. prava and E. seeana in both its distribution and characteristics.

Distribution and habitat
This eucalypt grows in woodland on shallow, sandy soils, usually on ridges and slopes. It is found on the Blackdown Tableland and southeastern Darling Downs in Queensland and on the Northern Tablelands of New South Wales as far south as Emmaville.

Conservation status
Eucalyptus interstans is listed as "least concern" under the Queensland Government Nature Conservation Act 1992.

References

interstans
Myrtales of Australia
Flora of New South Wales
Flora of Queensland
Trees of Australia
Plants described in 1990
Taxa named by Lawrence Alexander Sidney Johnson
Taxa named by Ken Hill (botanist)